The Laguna Volcanic Field, also known as the San Pablo Volcanic Field, is an active volcanic field in the Philippines, located between Laguna de Bay, Mount Banahaw volcano complex and Mount Malepunyo range. It is part of the larger Southwestern Luzon Volcanic Field (SWLVF).

Many of the maars are aligned along a NE-SW trend. Three generations of maars are present, with the oldest being sediment-filled, like the ones found in Calauan. The youngest maars contain deep lakes with many concentrated in the city of San Pablo.

Volcanism is still evident through the presence of geothermal areas like mud and hot springs.  The areas south of Mt. Makiling is the site of one of the earliest geothermal plants in the country.

Volcanic features
The Philippine Institute of Volcanology and Seismology (PHIVOLCS) lists some of the maars and cones situated in the Laguna volcanic field. All are classified as inactive.

Maars
 Alligator Lake, Los Baños 
 Lake Bunot, San Pablo 
 Lake Calibato, San Pablo 
 Lake Gunao, Dolores, Quezon 
 Imoc Maar, San Pablo 
 Lake Muhikap, San Pablo 
 Lake Palakpakin, San Pablo 
 Lake Pandin, San Pablo 
 Sampaloc Lake, San Pablo 
 Lake Tikub, Tiaong, Quezon 
 Lake Yambo, San Pablo 
 Dolotina Maar, San Pablo

Cones
Named as hills
 Bayaquitos Hill, Nagcarlan 
 Bunsulan Hills, Alaminos 
 Imok Hill, Calauan 
 La Mesa Hill, Calamba 
 Mani Hill, Alaminos 
 Mapait Hills, Alaminos 
 Mayondon Hill, Los Baños 
 Palindan Hill, Alaminos 
 Tanza Hill, Alaminos 

Named as mountains
 Mount Atimba (Atimbia), Nagcarlan 
 Mount Bayaquitos, Nagcarlan 
 Mount Bijiang, Calamba 
 Mount Buboy, Calauan 
 Mount Bulalo, Calauan 
 Mount Cabulugan, Bay 
 Mount Camotes, Calamba 
 Mount Lagula, San Pablo 
 Mount Lansay, Nagcarlan 
 Mount Luyong, Calauan 
 Mount Mabilog, Calauan 
 Mount Mabilog, Nagcarlan 
 Mount Malauban, San Pablo 
 Mount Malauban-Lansay, San Pablo 
 Mount Mapula, Calauan 
 Mount Masaia, Calamba 
 Mount Nagcarlan, Calauan 
 Mount Olila, Alaminos 
 Mount Tamlong, Calauan

See also
 List of active volcanoes in the Philippines
 Laguna Caldera
 Seven Lakes of San Pablo
 List of inactive volcanoes in the Philippines

External links
 Global Volcanism Program
  Philippines Institute of Volcanology and Seismology (PHIVOLCS)

References

Active volcanoes of the Philippines
San Pablo, Laguna
Landforms of Laguna (province)